Bretha Nemed Déidenach is the late title of an Early Irish law text dating from the eighth century.

Overview

Bretha Nemed Déidenach ('the last Bretha Nemed''') is one of the two principal surviving remnants of the celebrated Old Irish Bretha Nemed law "school", believed to have been composed early in the eighth century in Munster. The only surviving copy, now part of Trinity College, Dublin MS 1317 H.2.15B, was transcribed by Dubhaltach MacFhirbhisigh. Another related text, Bretha Nemed Toísech (the first Bretha Nemed) is now British Library MS Nero A 7.Bretha Nemed Déidenach contains extracts of works concerning poets and bards, along with passages on such subjects as fosterage, sureties, pledge-interests and land law. Much of it is written in the alliterative rosc style in what is now called Archaic or Old Irish. Because of the difficulty of the language, the text has never been translated. In addition, in parts the text is fragmentary.

It is not known where MacFhirbhisigh obtained his exemplar, nor when or where it was transcribed. Another text in the same MS – Duil Laithne – was written at Ballymacegan, County Tipperary, on 5 May 1643, so the Déidenach may have been copied in that period.

See also

 Early Irish law
 Old Irish
 Cáin Adomnáin
 Derbfine
 Collectio canonum Hibernensis

Editions and translation
 Diplomatic edition.
 Critical edition.

Portions of the text are translated in:
Watkins, Calvert (1963). "Indo-European metrics and archaic Irish verse." Celtica 6: 194–249: 226, 230, 233, 236, 240.
Ó Corráin, Donnchadh, Liam Breatnach and Aidan Breen (1984). "The laws of the Irish." Peritia 3. 382–438: 420–2.
Breatnach, Liam (1987). Uraicecht na Ríar. The Poetic Grades in Early Irish law. Early Irish Law Series 2. Dublin. 42–57.

References
Breathnach, Liam. "Canon Law and Secular Law in Early Ireland: The Significance of Bretha Nemed." Peritia 3 (1984): 439–59.

Ó Muraíle, Nollaig. The Celebrated Antiquary. Dubhaltach Mac Fhirbhisigh (c. 1600–1671)''. Maynooth: An Sagart, 1996. Especially pages 83–6.

External links
 The Law of the Couple: translation of an Irish legal text on marriage
 Dublin Institute for Advanced Studies – School of Celtic Studies Catalogue of relevant publications
 Solarguard Brehon Precis of Fergus Kelly's A Guide to Early Irish Law
 The Brehon Laws – Catholic Encyclopedia article

Early Gaelic legal texts
Irish manuscripts
Irish-language literature
Medieval manuscripts
8th-century documents
17th-century documents
17th-century manuscripts